Black Hat Middle East and Africa (Black Hat MEA) formerly @HACK is a three-day cybersecurity and hacking convention that annually takes place in Riyadh, Saudi Arabia, during Riyadh Season. It is one of the largest conventions in its industry.
 
It is co-organised by the Saudi Federation For Cybersecurity, Programming and Drones (SAFCSP), and informa tech. The event has been designed in association with the Black Hat Team.

History
 
The first event was held on 28–30 November 2021 at Riyadh Front Expo Centre, Riyadh, Saudi Arabia. It's a part of Riyadh Season. The first edition of the event had over 25,000 attendees, 250 cybersecurity exhibitors, 50 expert ethical hackers, and many Black Hat trainers. The event also held two contests, Capture The Flag and Bug Bounty. Black Hat MEA 2022 is set to take place from 15 to 17 November 2022, and will host 30,000 attendees, 250 exhibitors and 200 speakers.

Speakers and sponsors
 
Black Hat MEA's first event speakers included many industry experts, such as Jayson E. Street, Jenny Radcliffe, Bruce Schneier, and the sponsors included companies like IBM, Cisco, Honeywell, Fortinet, and Kaspersky. The Black Hat MEA 2022 speakers will include Kurt Sanger, Alissa Abdullah, Magda Lilia Chelly, Caleb Sima, Chris Roberts, Kim Albarella, and sponsors will include companies like Cisco, IBM, Spire and Infoblox.

See also
Web Summit
Consumer Electronics Show
Slush

References

Computer security conferences
Hacker conventions
Hacking (computer security)